Lukas Klapfer (born 25 December 1985) is an Austrian nordic combined skier who has been competing since 2002. His best World Cup finish was second in the normal hill Gundersen event in Austria in February 2009.

At the FIS Nordic World Ski Championships 2009 in Liberec, Klapfer was scheduled to compete in the 10 km normal hill mass start event, but did not start.

World Cup wins

References

External links
 

1985 births
Austrian male Nordic combined skiers
Living people
Nordic combined skiers at the 2014 Winter Olympics
Nordic combined skiers at the 2018 Winter Olympics
Olympic Nordic combined skiers of Austria
Olympic bronze medalists for Austria
Medalists at the 2014 Winter Olympics
Medalists at the 2018 Winter Olympics
Olympic medalists in Nordic combined
People from Eisenerz
FIS Nordic World Ski Championships medalists in Nordic combined
Sportspeople from Styria